North American donkeys constitute approximately 0.1% of the worldwide donkey population. Donkeys were brought from Europe to the New World in the fifteenth century with the Second Voyage of Christopher Columbus, and subsequently spread into Mexico. They first reached what is now the United States in the late seventeenth century. Donkeys arrived in large numbers in the western United States during the gold rushes of the nineteenth century, as pack animals and for use in mines and ore-grinding mills. From about 1785, some large donkeys were imported from Europe to the eastern part of the continent.

There are no true-breeding North American donkey breeds. Breed societies in Canada and the United States register donkeys according to their size, as miniature, standard or mammoth donkeys. These are reported as breeds to the Domestic Animal Diversity database of the Food and Agriculture Organization of the United Nations by the National Animal Germplasm Program of the Agricultural Research Service of the US Department of Agriculture, as are the Burro – a feral population of the western United States – and the Spotted, a color breed.

History 

The first asses came to the Americas on ships of the second voyage of Christopher Columbus, and were landed at Hispaniola in 1495. In the early days of the Conquest, jackasses were highly valued as sires for mules, which were esteemed as riding animals by the Spanish, and reserved for the nobility. Mules were bred for expeditions to mainland America, with males preferred for pack animals and the females for riding. The first shipment of mules, along with three jacks and twelve jennies, arrived in Mexico from Cuba ten years after the conquest of the Aztecs in 1521.  Mules were used in silver mines, and each Spanish outpost in the empire bred its own mules from its own jack.

The first presence of donkeys in what is now the United States is sometimes reported to date from 1679, when a Jesuit priest named Eusebio Kino took some from Sonora in Spanish Mexico to a new mission at San Xavier del Bac in what is now Arizona; however, Kino did not reach the Americas before about 1681, and was not in Sonora until 1687. Donkeys arrived in large numbers in the western United States during the gold rushes of the nineteenth century, as pack animals and for use in mines and ore-grinding mills. The major use of donkeys came to an end with the end of the mining boom and the introduction of railroads in the West. With little value, many animals were turned loose to become the populations of free-roaming burros that inhabit the West today.

From about 1785, some large donkeys were imported from Europe to the eastern United States, and were used for the production of mules. In 1888 the American Breeders Association of Jacks and Jennets started a stud-book for these animals under the name American Mammoth Jack. In 1923 it merged with the Standard Jack and Jennet Registry of America, which had been set up in 1908; in 1988 the name was changed to American Mammoth Jackstock Registry. Breeds that may have influenced the mammoth include the Maltese, the Baudet du Poitou, the Andalusian, the Majorcan and the Catalan.

In the twentieth century, donkeys came to be more frequently kept as pets in the United States and in other wealthy nations. In 1929 Robert Green of New York imported seven donkeys of the small indigenous Sardinian breed to the United States. The first foal was born in the same year. Although never considered miniature in their country of origin, these animals were soon known as Miniature or Miniature Mediterranean donkeys. Green was a lifelong advocate, and said  of them: "Miniature donkeys possess the affectionate nature of a Newfoundland, the resignation of a cow, the durability of a mule, the courage of a tiger, and an intellectual capability only slightly inferior to man's." By 1935 there were 52 of them, and some were sold. Further Sardinian donkeys were imported, as well as similar but quite distinct Sicilian animals. A register of miniature donkeys was started in 1958 by Bea Langfeld, who was the first professional breeder of miniature donkeys in the United States; in 1987 it was merged into that of the American Donkey and Mule Society, which was formed in 1967. 

Both the Canadian Donkey and Mule Association and the American Donkey and Mule Society register donkeys according to their size, as miniature, standard or mammoth donkeys. These are reported as breeds to the Domestic Animal Diversity database of the Food and Agriculture Organization of the United Nations by the National Animal Germplasm Program of the Agricultural Research Service of the US Department of Agriculture, as are the feral Burro population of the western United States and the Spotted, a color breed.

Characteristics 

Both the Canadian Donkey and Mule Association and the American Donkey and Mule Society register donkeys according to their size, as miniature, standard or mammoth donkeys.

Adult miniature donkeys stand  or less at the withers.

Any donkey with at least two spots behind the throatlatch and above the legs can be registered with the American Council of Spotted Asses under the trademarked name American Spotted Ass.

Notes

References 

Mammals of North America
Donkey breeds
Donkey breeds originating in the United States